Marcela Elizabeth Prieto Castañeda (born 11 March 1992) is a Mexican racing cyclist, who most recently rode for Mexican amateur team .

Major results
Source: 

2015
 3rd Road race, National Road Championships
2017
 3rd Road race, National Road Championships
2018
 1st Overall Vuelta Femenina a Guatemala
1st Stage 2
 1st Gran Premio Comite Olimpico Nacional Femenino
 2nd Overall Vuelta Internacional Femenina a Costa Rica
 3rd Overall Vuelta a Colombia Femenina
1st Stage 4
 7th Overall Tour of the Gila
 10th Overall Tour of California
2019
 7th Overall Joe Martin Stage Race
2022
 7th Overall Tour of the Gila

References

External links
 

1992 births
Living people
Mexican female cyclists
Place of birth missing (living people)
21st-century Mexican women